Trabzon Telekomspor is a football club in located in Trabzon, Turkey.

The club plays in the Amatör Futbol Ligleri.

Stadium
Currently the team plays at the 1800 capacity Yavuz Selim Stadyumu.

Kits
Trabzon Telekomspor plays in white and light-blue kits.

League participations
TFF Third League: 1989–2003
Turkish Regional Amateur League: 2003–?

References

External links
Blog
Amator Futbol
Mackolik

Sport in Trabzon
Football clubs in Turkey